Magdalene Epply-Staudinger (22 September 1907 – 23 July 2005) was an Austrian diver. She competed in two events at the 1932 Summer Olympics and the 1936 Summer Olympics.

References

External links
 

1907 births
2005 deaths
Austrian female divers
Olympic divers of Austria
Divers at the 1932 Summer Olympics
Divers from Vienna